The term baroque horse describes a group of horse breeds, usually descended from and retaining the distinctive characteristics of a particular type of horse that rose to prominence in Europe during the Baroque era, after significant development throughout the Middle Ages. It describes the type of agile but strong-bodied descendants of horses in the Middle Ages such as the destrier. Specific ancestors of this type include the Neapolitan horse, and the Iberian horse of Barb ancestry known in the Middle Ages as the Spanish Jennet. They are characterized by powerful hindquarters, a muscular, arched neck, a straight or slightly convex profile, and usually a full, thick mane and tail. These horses are particularly well suited for the haute ecole discipline of classical dressage.

Modern breeds considered of baroque type include the following:
Andalusian
Frederiksborger
Friesian
Ginetta
Kladruber
Lipizzan
Lusitano
Menorquín
 Murgese

Assorted crossbreds developed from these breeds also may attain breed status over time as they develop a breed registry and other indicia of purebred status.

Historically, the destrier was a war horse. In the Renaissance its descendants became trained in the haute ecole discipline of classical dressage. In the modern world, these horses are still seen in modern dressage and continue to perform haute ecole in venues such as the Spanish Riding School and the Cadre Noir. Their build also suits them for sports such as mounted bullfighting.

See also
Classical dressage
Destrier
Horses in the Middle Ages
Horses in warfare

References

Types of horse
Warhorses